The 2020 Gent–Wevelgem was a road cycling classic race that took place on 11 October 2020 in Belgium. It was the 82nd edition of Gent–Wevelgem and the eighteenth event of the 2020 UCI World Tour.

One of the Spring Classics, Gent-Wevelgem was originally scheduled for 29 March 2020, but was cancelled due to the COVID-19 pandemic in Belgium. The race was rescheduled for 11 October 2020 as part of a new autumnal 'spring classics' season,  though it was only the Belgian races which were eventually held.

Route
The race organisers asked spectators to follow the race from home, and did not release details of the route to the public before the start of the race.   Parts of the race due to pass through France were removed due to the worsening of the pandemic in France. The start times of the races were also adapted to avoid a clash with the 2020 Giro d'Italia. For the first time, the men's race started before the women's race.

Teams
All nineteen UCI WorldTeams and six UCI ProTeams made up the twenty-five teams that competed in the race. Though most teams entered the maximum of seven riders, and  entered only six, while  entered only five. Only 95 of the 170 riders in the race finished.

UCI WorldTeams

 
 
 
 
 
 
 
 
 
 
 
 
 
 
 
 
 
 
 

UCI ProTeams

Result

References

External links

2020 UCI World Tour
2020 in Belgian sport
2020
Cycling events postponed due to the COVID-19 pandemic
October 2020 sports events in Belgium